The OId Jewish Cemetery is a cemetery in Sarajevo, Bosnia and Herzegovina. It is located on the slopes of Trebević mountain, in the Kovačići-Debelo Brdo area, in the south-western part of the city. It is the largest Jewish cemetery in Southeast Europe. It was in use for approximately four hundred years from the beginning of the 16th or 17th century until 1966.

History
Established by Sephardic Jews during the Ottoman period, it also became the burial ground for Ashkenazi Jews after they arrived in Sarajevo with the Austro-Hungarian Empire in the late 19th century. It contains more than 3850 tombstones and covers an area of 31160 square meters. It has four monuments dedicated to the victims of fascism: a Sephardi one designed by Jahiel Finci and erected in 1952, two Ashkenazi ones, and one dedicated to the victims of Ustasha militants.

During war of the 1990s
The Jewish Cemetery was on the front line during the war in Bosnia and Herzegovina, and was used as an artillery position by Bosnian Serbs. It was thus severely damaged by bullets and fire caused by explosions. It was also heavily mined but was completely cleared in 1996.

Notable burials and memorials
Notable people buried in the cemetery include Rabbi Samuel Baruh (first rabbi of Sarajevo from 1630 to 1650; his grave is believed to be the oldest in the cemetery), Rabbi Isak Pardo (rabbi from 1781 to 1810), Rabbi Avraham Abinun (Grand Rabbi from 1856 to 1858), Moshe ben Rafael Attias (1845 – 1916), Laura Levi Papo LaBohoreta (writer of the early 20th century), and Isak Samokovlija.
There are also four memorials erected to the victims of Fascist terror, along with several cenotaphs, an empty memorial tombs, with the names of people who died elsewhere and whose grave locations are unknown.

Genizah
Separate vault or "grave" for damaged books known as a Genizah, is located in the southeastern part of the cemetery, with the first burial taking place on 3 July 1916. Assumption is that some 14 chests of holy books were buried in the second burial ceremony, so currently exhumation of Geniza is under way to determine its content.

National and World Heritage designation
The cemetery is designated as a national monument of Bosnia and Herzegovina under the name "Sepulchral ensemble – Jewish cemetery in Sarajevo". In preparation for nomination for inclusion on the World Heritage Site list, Bosnian delegates submitted documentation for the tentative list at UNESCO on April 3, 2018, under the "Cultural" category and criteria "(ii)", "(iii)", "(iv)", "(vi)".

Gallery

See also 
 History of the Jews in Bosnia and Herzegovina
 Moshe ben Rafael Attias
 Isak Samokovlija

References

Cemeteries in Sarajevo
Buildings and structures in Sarajevo
Jewish cemeteries
National Monuments of Bosnia and Herzegovina
World Heritage Tentative List for Bosnia and Herzegovina
Judaism in Bosnia and Herzegovina
Sephardi Jewish culture in Bosnia and Herzegovina